Cornhill railway station was an intermediate stop situated on the Great North of Scotland Railway (GNoSR) line from Cairnie Junction to . There was only a single platform at Cornhill that served the nearby village that lies in Fordyce Parish, of what was once Banffshire,  from Banff itself. The line ran to Tillynaught where it split to reach Banff by a branch line or Elgin by the Moray Coast line.

Cornhill was opened in 1859 by the Banff, Portsoy and Strathisla Railway, and in 1867 was absorbed by the GNoSR who took over the line and operated it until grouping in 1923. Passing into British Railways ownership in 1948, the line was, like the rest of the ex-GNoSR lines along the Moray coast, considered for closure as part of the Beeching report and closure notices were issued in 1963.  Passenger and freight services were withdrawn in May 1968.

Station infrastructure
The surviving station building was constructed circa 1886 and was built of wood. Two sidings, a crane and a coal loading dock are shown in 1902. An auction mart is shown next to the station that was still present in 1988.

In 2011 much of this station remained, the station building, single platform, goods shed, loading bank and the station master's house. The station site was in use as a coal yard.

See also
List of Great North of Scotland Railway stations

References
Notes

Sources

External links
Cornhill station in 1988
RailScot - Banff Portsoy and Strathisla Railway
The Banff Branch

Former Great North of Scotland Railway stations
Railway stations in Great Britain opened in 1859
Railway stations in Great Britain closed in 1968
Disused railway stations in Aberdeenshire
Beeching closures in Scotland
1859 establishments in Scotland
1868 disestablishments in Scotland